The Law Commands is a 1937 American Western film directed by William Nigh and starring Tom Keene, Lorraine Randall, Robert Fiske and Budd Buster. It was produced by the Poverty Row company Crescent Pictures.

Cast 
Tom Keene as Dr. Keith Kenton
Lorraine Randall as Mary Lee Johnson
Robert Fiske as John Abbott
Budd Buster as Kentuck' Jones
Matthew Betz as Frago, lead henchman
John Merton as Frank Clark
Carl Stockdale as Jed Johnson
Marie Stoddard as Min Jones
Charlotte Treadway as Martha Abbott
David Sharpe as Danny Johnson
Allan Cavan as Judge
Horace B. Carpenter as Jason, lead farmer

References

Bibliography
 Pitts, Michael R. Western Movies: A Guide to 5,105 Feature Films. McFarland, 2012.

External links 

1937 films
American black-and-white films
1937 Western (genre) films
American Western (genre) films
Films directed by William Nigh
1930s English-language films
1930s American films